Karl Gunnar Harding (born 11 June 1940) is a Swedish poet, novelist, essayist and translator, considered 'one of Sweden's foremost poets'. Among his other poetry collections is Starnberger See from 1977. Among his novels is Luffaren Svarta Hästen from 1977. He published the children's book Mannen och paraplyet in 1990. He was awarded the Dobloug Prize in 2011.

Biography 
Gunnar Harding was born in Sundsvall and brought up in Bromma as the son of the doctor Gösta Harding. He studied painting in Stockholm and was a jazz musician before making his literary debut in 1967 with Lokomotivet som frös fast. During his early career, Harding travelled extensively in America, and this influenced his work.

Harding is noted primarily for his poetry (mostly in free verse but also significant prose-poetry). Alongside this, he has written essays, a book about the origins of jazz called Kreol, and a few stories.

He has also worked as an editor, for Lyrikvännen ('poetry-lover') 1971–1974, for Artes for many years, and for Artes International during its five-year run. He has been a member of the Samfundet De Nio (chair number 5) since 1993 and served on the 1973 Swedish Bible committion 1981–1989.

Harding's literary significance is partly as an introducer of foreign modernism, especially French, American and British poetry, into Swedish literature.

Harding also takes a lively interest in jazz and likes to read his poetry with jazz as background music.

Bibliography

Literary writing

 1967 – Lokomotivet som frös fast
 1968 – Den svenske cyklistens sång
 1969 – Blommor till James Dean
 1970 – Örnen har landat
 1971 – Guillaume Apollinaires fantastiska liv
 1972 – Skallgång
 1974 – Poesi 1967–1973
 1975 – Ballader
 1977 – Starnberger See
 1977 – Luffaren Svarta Hästen och det hemska rånmordet i Leksand
 1978 – Bilddikt, with Olle Kåks
 1978 – Den trådlösa fantasin
 1980 – Tillbaka till dig
 1983 – Gasljus
 1987 – Stjärndykaren
 1989 – Guillaume Apollinaires gåtfulla leende: en ändlös biografi
 1990 – Mannen och paraplyet, text: Gunnar Harding; pictures: Catharina Günther-Rådström
 1990 – Mitt vinterland
 1991 – Kreol
 1993 – Överallt där vinden finns: dikter i urval 1969–1990
 1995 – Stora scenen
 2001 – Tal på Övralid 6 juli 2001
 2001 – Salongsstycken kring Dante Gabriel Rossetti
 2003 – Det brinnande barnet
 2007 – Dikter 1965–2003
 2009 – Innerstad
 2012 – Blues for Jimmy ; Nordvästexpressen ; Martin Luther King [from the author's original manuscript of Blommor till James Dean] (Tragus)
 2013 – Mitt poetiska liv (autobiography)

Translations by Harding into Swedish
 1966 – 4 poeter, translations from Lawrence Ferlinghetti, Allen Ginsberg, Anselm Hollo and Lionel Kearns (Bok och Bild)
 1969 – Amerikansk undergroundpoesi (Wahlström & Widstrand)
 1970 – Vladimir Majakovskij: För full hals, with Ulf Bergström (Wahlström & Widstrand)
 1971 – Allen Ginsberg: Tårgas & Solrosor, with Gösta Friberg (FIB:s Lyrikklubb)
 1976 – Den vrålande parnassen, with Bengt Jangfeldt (rysk avantgardepoesi)
 1978 – O Paris – Apollinaire och hans epok i poesi, bild och dokument (FIB:s Lyrikklubb/Tiden)
 1985 – Vladimir Majakovskij: Jag!, with Bengt Jangfeldt
 1988 – Frank O'Hara: Till minne av mina känslor
 1989 – Guillaume Apollinaire: Dikter till Lou, pictures by Olle Kåks
 1995 – Är vi långt från Montmartre? Apollinaire och hans epok i poesi, bild och dokument
 1997 – En katedral av färgat glas: Shelley, Byron, Keats och deras epok
 1998 – 3 x New York, interpretations of John Ashbery, Kenneth Koch and Ron Padgett
 2000 – Och drog likt drömmar bort: Coleridge, Wordsworth och deras epok
 2002 – Där döda murar står: Lord Byron och hans samtida
 2005 – Beat! (poetry and prose from the beat generation, with Per Planhammar)
 2006 – Mina Loy: Baedeker för månresenärer
 2007 – Catullus: Dikter om kärlek och hat, with Tore Janson
 2012 – John Donne: Skabrösa elegier och heliga sonetter (Ellerströms)

Translations of Harding's work into English

 1970 – The Fabulous Life of Guillaume Apollinaire, trans. by Sydney Bernard Smith (Iowa City: Windhover, 1970; Dublin: Raven Arts, 1982) [part of Guillaume Apollinaires fantastiska liv]
 1973 – They Killed Sitting Bull and Other Poems, trans. by Robin Fulton (London: Magazine Editions) [a selection of 25 early poems], repr. with additional translations by Anselm Hollo as Tidewater (Grosse Pointe Farms, MI: Marick Press, 2009)
 2014 – Gunnar Harding, Guarding the Air: Selected Poems of Gunnar Harding, ed. and trans. by Roger Greenwald (Boston, MA: Black Widow Press) [selected poems]

Anthologies

 1979 – Modern Swedish Poetry in Translation, with Anselm Hollo

Discography
 Jazz och Poesi - Gunnar Harding och Sumpens Swingsters (LP with text volume, 1982)

Prizes and distinctions 

1975 – Tidningen Vi:s litteraturpris
 1987 – Stipendium ur Lena Vendelfelts minnesfond
 1988 – Carl Emil Englund-priset för Stjärndykaren
 1992 – Bellmanpriset
 1995 – Svenska Dagbladets litteraturpris
 2000 – Wahlström & Widstrands litteraturpris
 2001 – Ferlinpriset
 2001 – Övralidspriset
 2002 – Letterstedtska priset för översättningar för Och drog likt drömmar bort: Coleridge, Wordsworth och deras epok
 2004 – Sveriges Radios Lyrikpris
 2008 – Litteris et Artibus
 2010 – Karlfeldt-priset
 2011 – Doblougska priset
 2013 – Elsa Thulins översättarpris

References

1940 births
Living people
20th-century Swedish poets
20th-century Swedish novelists
Swedish essayists
Swedish translators
Dobloug Prize winners
Swedish male poets
Swedish male novelists
Male essayists
International Writing Program alumni
20th-century Swedish male writers
21st-century Swedish novelists
Litteris et Artibus recipients